The Omen is a horror film franchise beginning in 1976. The series centers on Damien Thorn, a child born of Satan and given to Robert and Katherine Thorn, before being passed along the Thorn families as a child. It is revealed among the families that Damien is in fact meant to be the Antichrist, and as an adult is attempting to gain control of the Thorn business and reach for the presidency.

Films 

The Omen is the original film in the series, directed by Richard Donner and written by David Seltzer. The story introduces Robert Thorn, the American Ambassador in Italy who adopts the newborn Damien to replace the newborn that he has been told was stillborn. When Damien reaches the age of five as Robert is transferred to Britain, strange events unfold, beginning with the boy's nanny committing suicide during his birthday party. Soon afterward Robert encounters Father Brennan, a Catholic priest who was present at Damien's birth, who attempts to warn him that the child would eventually kill him and his wife; Brennan soon dies, impaled by a falling church spire. Only after Robert's wife Katherine ends up hospitalized with a miscarriage does he come to believe Brennan; Robert and a photographer named Jennings then travel to Rome, where they learn that Damien is the Antichrist, and that the death of Robert's child was arranged so the Antichrist child could be raised by a politician. In the meantime, Katherine Thorn is murdered by Mrs. Baylock, Damien's second nanny, who in reality is a member of the Satanists who arranged Damien's upbringing, and will kill in order to suppress any threat to him. Arriving in Megiddo to find Bugenhagen, an exorcist and archaeologist, Robert is presented with the only means to kill Damien: the Seven Daggers of Megiddo. Though he initially refuses, it takes both the death of Jennings and discovering the Mark of the Beast on Damien's head to convince Robert to go through with it. But despite killing Mrs. Baylock after a struggle, Robert is killed by the authorities before he can kill Damien. Damien is then left in the care of his uncle, Richard Thorn.

The second film, Damien: Omen II, starts with Bugenhagen attempting to send Richard a package, but he and his friend Morris end up being buried alive in Megiddo. The audience is then introduced to Richard's son Mark and his second wife Ann. Now a teenager, Damien attends military school alongside Mark while his subconscious, manifesting in the form of a raven, kills Richard's aunt Marion, Jennings's friend Joan Hart, and Thorn Industries manager Bill Atherton. Atherton's death is beneficial for senior manager Paul Buher, another member of the Satanist group Baylock was part of. Another member, Sgt. Neff, guides Damien to learn his true nature by advising him to read the Book of Revelation. Though fearful of it at first, unconsciously killing Dr. David Pasarian and a medical physician who tested his blood, Damien comes to accept his fate as he begins to consciously kill anyone who stands in his way, including his cousin Mark and Dr. Charles Warren. Though Richard accepted the truth upon receiving the Daggers of Megiddo from Bugenhagen's package, he is murdered by Ann; Damien then kills her, despite her being one of his disciples.

The third film, Omen III: The Final Conflict, follows the adult Damien, now head of his uncle's company and arranging his position as American Ambassador in Britain to prevent the Second Coming—which would gradually weaken his powers—by having his followers slaughter every male British child born on March 24. Though he managed to kill six of the seven monks who each brandish a Dagger of Megiddo, their leader Father DeCarlo lives. Damien unknowingly causes his own downfall by his association with a journalist named Kate Reynolds who kills him at his moment of weakness. But as Damien's death did not occur in the manner that Bugenhagen learned, the Antichrist only suffered a temporary demise.

In the fourth and final film of the original series, Omen IV: The Awakening, it is revealed that Damien's followers arranged for his biological daughter Delia to be adopted by two attorneys, Gene and Karen York. While nothing seems wrong at first, compared to her father, Delia is fully aware of her powers as she terrorizes her mother Karen. Karen finds herself pregnant and hires a private detective to find out about Delia's lineage. Along the way, she believes Delia is the Antichrist. A string of bizarre accidental deaths follows, before Karen gives birth to her son Alexander while falling into a paranoia as she tries to reveal her daughter's true identity. With the help of the private detective, Karen learns that Delia is the daughter of Damien Thorn while holding her family doctor, Dr. Hastings, at gunpoint. Upon learning Dr. Hastings is a Satanist, Karen learns that the reborn Antichrist is actually Alexander: Delia's twin brother whose embryo was inside Delia the entire time and implanted into Karen by Hastings. Though Karen adamantly wished to kill Alexander and tries to do so, the baby's powers cause her to commit suicide, leaving Alexander and Delia still alive to continue their birth father's work.

The 2006 remake of the first film, also titled The Omen, was directed and produced by John Moore. Starring Liev Schreiber and Julia Stiles, the film was met with mixed reviews but with general box office success. With a budget of $25 million, the film grossed $54 million domestic and $64 million in other territories, totalling $119 million.

In 2016, an Omen prequel was announced to be in the works, with Ben Jacoby writing the script and Antonio Campos in talks to direct. In May 2022, Arkasha Stevenson was revealed to direct the film. The First Omen is written by Tim Smith and Arkasha Stevenson, starring Sonia Braga, Bill Nighy, Nell Tiger Free, Ralph Ineson, Andrea Arcangeli, Anton Alexander, Tawfeek Barhom, Maria Caballero and Mia McGovern Zaini.

Cast and crew

Cast 

{| class="wikitable" style="text-align:center; width:99%;"
|-
! rowspan="3" style="width:15%;"| Character
! colspan="5" style="text-align:center;"| Film
! style="text-align:center;"| Television series
|-
! style="width:10%;"| The Omen
! style="width:10%;"| Omen II
! style="width:10%;"| The Final Conflict
! style="width:10%;"| The Awakening
! style="width:10%;"| The Omen
! style="width:10%;"| Damien
|-
! style="background:ivory;"| 
! style="background:ivory;"| 
! style="background:ivory;"| 
! style="background:ivory;"| 
! style="background:ivory;"| 
! style="background:ivory;"| 
|-
! Damien Thorn
| Harvey Spencer Stephens
| Jonathan Scott-Taylor
| Sam Neill
| 
| Seamus Davey-Fitzpatrick
| Bradley JamesHarvey Spencer Stephens
|-
! Robert Thorn
| Gregory Peck
| 
| colspan="2" style="background:#d3d3d3;" |
| Liev Schreiber
| Gregory Peck
|-
! Carl Bugenhagen 
| colspan="2" | Leo McKern
| colspan="2" style="background:#d3d3d3;" |
| Michael Gambon
| Leo McKern
|-
! Katherine Thorn
| Lee Remick
| colspan="3" style="background:#d3d3d3;" |
| Julia Stiles
| Lee Remick
|-
! Mrs. Willa Baylock
| Billie Whitelaw
| colspan="3" style="background:#d3d3d3;" |
| Mia Farrow
| Billie Whitelaw
|-
! Keith Jennings
| David Warner
| colspan="3" style="background:#d3d3d3;" |
| David Thewlis
| David Warner
|-
! Father Brennan
| Patrick Troughton
| colspan="3" style="background:#d3d3d3;" |
| Pete Postlethwaite
| Patrick Troughton
|-
! Father Spiletto
| Martin Benson
| colspan="3" style="background:#d3d3d3;" |
| Giovanni Lombardo Radice
| Martin Benson
|-
! Brother Matteus
| Tommy Duggan
| style="background:#d3d3d3;" |
| Tommy Duggan
| colspan="3" style="background:#d3d3d3;" |
|-
! U.S. President
| Gerald Ford
| style="background:#d3d3d3;" |
| Mason Adams
| colspan="3" style="background:#d3d3d3;" |
|-
! Ann Thorn (née Rutledge)
| style="background:#d3d3d3;" |
| Lee Grant
| colspan="3" style="background:#d3d3d3;" |
| Barbara Hershey
|-
! Richard Thorn
| style="background:#d3d3d3;" |
| William Holden
| colspan="4" style="background:#d3d3d3;" |
|-
! Paul Buher
| style="background:#d3d3d3;" |
| Robert Foxworth
| colspan="4" style="background:#d3d3d3;" |
|-
! Kate Reynolds
| colspan="2" style="background:#d3d3d3;" |
| Lisa Harrow
| colspan="3" style="background:#d3d3d3;" |
|-
! Father DeCarlo
| colspan="2" style="background:#d3d3d3;" |
| Rossano Brazzi
| colspan="3" style="background:#d3d3d3;" |
|-
! Harvey Pleydell Dean
| colspan="2" style="background:#d3d3d3;" |
| Don Gordon
| colspan="3" style="background:#d3d3d3;" |
|-
! Delia York
| colspan="3" style="background:#d3d3d3;" |
| Asia VieiraBrianne Harrett(3 years old)Rebecca Cynader(2 years old)Shelby Adams(baby)
| colspan="2" style="background:#d3d3d3;" |
|-
! Karen York
| colspan="3" style="background:#d3d3d3;" |
| Faye Grant
| colspan="2" style="background:#d3d3d3;" |
|-
! Gene York
| colspan="3" style="background:#d3d3d3;" |
| Michael Woods
| colspan="2" style="background:#d3d3d3;" |
|-
! Reporter
| colspan="4" style="background:#d3d3d3;" |
| Harvey Spencer Stephens
| style="background:#d3d3d3;" |
|-
! Simone Baptiste
| colspan="5" style="background:#d3d3d3;" |
| Megalyn Echikunwoke
|-
! Amani Golkar
| colspan="5" style="background:#d3d3d3;" |
| Omid Abtahi
|-
! Detective James Shay
| colspan="5" style="background:#d3d3d3;" |
| David Meunier
|-
! John Lyons
| colspan="5" style="background:#d3d3d3;" |
| Scott Wilson
|-
! The Cassocked Man
| colspan="5" style="background:#d3d3d3;" |
| Gerry Pearson
|-
! Jacob Shay
| colspan="5" style="background:#d3d3d3;" |
| Brody Bover
|-
! Veronica Selvaggio
| colspan="5" style="background:#d3d3d3;" |
| Melanie Scrofano
|-
! Paula Sciarra
| colspan="5" style="background:#d3d3d3;" |
| Sandrine Holt
|-
! Kelly Baptiste
| colspan="5" style="background:#d3d3d3;" |
| Tiffany Hines
|}

 Reception 

 Box office performance 

 Critical response 

 Television 
 The Omen (1995) 
In 1995, a television pilot titled The Omen aired on NBC, in September 8 of that year. Directed by Jack Sholder, the hour-long episode was intended as an attempt to develop The Omen franchise into a TV series. Although Donner was attached to the project as an executive producer, the pilot failed and the series never moved forward. Unrelated to the previous films, The Omen follows a group of people who are tracking down an entity to which they are all independently linked.

 Damien (2016) 

A new television series called Damien was in development at the network Lifetime before it was moved to A&E with Bradley James starring in the title role. The series aired from March 7 to

May 9, 2016. The series follows 30 year old Damien, who has forgotten his Satanic past, facing his true identity. Ann Rutledge (Barbara Hershey), who has protected Damien all his life, helps him embrace his Antichrist side.

 Novels 
There are five novels in the Omen series, the first three being novelizations of their film counterparts:
 The Omen, written in 1976 by David Seltzer
 Damien: Omen II, written in 1978 by Joseph Howard
 Omen III: The Final Conflict, written in 1980 by Gordon McGill
 Omen IV: Armageddon 2000, written in 1983 by Gordon McGill
 Omen V: The Abomination, written in 1985 by Gordon McGill

 Other media 
Three documentaries regarding the series have been made: 666: The Omen - Revealed (2000), The Omen: Legacy (2001), and The Curse of The Omen'' (2005).

The 1976 film was also remade into Tamil as Jenma Natchathram (1991).

Notes

References 

 
Horror film franchises
Apocalyptic fiction
20th Century Studios franchises
Fictional depictions of the Antichrist
Demons in film
1970s English-language films
1980s English-language films
1990s English-language films
2000s English-language films